This is a list of Mexican films released in 2001.

2001

External links

References

2001
Films
Mexican